June McCarroll (June 30, 1867 – March 30, 1954) is credited by the California Department of Transportation with the idea of delineating highways with a painted line to separate lanes of highway traffic, although this claim is disputed by the Federal Highway Administration and the Michigan Department of Transportation as two Michigan men painted centerlines before her. She was born in Lewis County, New York. She was a nurse (later a physician) with the Southern Pacific Railroad in the early 20th century. According to a historic marker in Indio, California, after a near-collision in her Model T in 1917, "She personally painted the first known stripe in California on Indio Boulevard, then part of U.S. Route 99, during 1917."

Early life
McCarroll was born and raised in the Adirondacks. McCarroll's mother Adaline died December 9, 1867, when McCarroll was only five months old. By the 1880 census, her now remarried father, and his family was living in Emporia, Kansas, where he served a time as mayor. By 1888 her father had abandoned his second wife and son in Kansas and moved to Los Angeles, California, where McCarroll later joined him. On December 31, 1896, June Adaline Whittelsey, age 29, married Timothy Preston Hill, age 36, in Los Angeles, in a ceremony performed by Rev. J. Thomson of the Unity Church. Mr. Hill was a Massachusetts native living in Los Angeles as early as 1888. It was a short-lived relationship, and by 1900 they had separated. The 1900 Los Angeles census shows McCarroll as June Hill, physician, married three years but no husband in household. According to the 1910 census, 1900 was the same year of McCarroll's second marriage to James R. Robertson. As the final divorce from Hill did not take place until November 1915, likely her marriage to Robertson was common-law.

McCarroll attended a medical college in Chicago, then eventually moved back to Southern California in 1904 with her second husband, James R. Robertson. They had hoped that the desert climate would help him recuperate from tuberculosis, but Robertson died in 1914. Within two years, she had remarried, this time to Frank Taylor McCarroll, the local station manager for the Southern Pacific Railroad. From 1907 to 1916, she was the only physician regularly practicing in the vast desert between the Salton Sea and Palm Springs. She was also the only physician serving the five Indian reservations in the area on behalf of the Bureau of Indian Affairs.

Highway marking

In the fall of 1917, McCarroll was driving on the road leading to her office near Indio, California, on a stretch of highway that would later be incorporated into U.S. Route 99; the highway remains today as part of Indio Boulevard. She was run off the road by a truck, as she recalled many years later:

McCarroll soon communicated her idea to the local chamber of commerce and the Riverside County Board of Supervisors, with no success. Finally, she took it upon herself to hand-paint a white stripe down the middle of the road, thus establishing the actual width of the lane to prevent similar accidents. Through the Indio Women's Club and many similar women's organizations, McCarroll launched a vigorous statewide letter writing campaign on behalf of her proposal. Later the idea was adopted worldwide.

On April 24, 2002, to honor her contribution to road safety, California officially designated the stretch of Interstate 10 near Indio east of the Indio Boulevard/Jefferson Street exit as "The Doctor June McCarroll Memorial Freeway." In October 2003, a memorial plaque honoring McCarroll was placed on a small concrete obelisk next to the intersection of Indio Boulevard and Fargo Street in Indio, California. The plaque is located at GPS coordinates .

The Federal Highway Administration has acknowledged Kenneth I. Sawyer of the Marquette County Road Commission in Michigan for painting the first highway centerline in 1917 on what was then M-15 (part of the modern County Road 492). Photographs from 1917 of the Michigan location clearly show the centerline in place during that summer, before McCarroll's fall 1917 incident. The first centerline was painted by Edward N. Hines in the Detroit area in 1911 on a city street, so neither can lay claim to the very first centerline in the country; for his efforts, Hines was awarded the first Paul Mijksenaar Design for Function Award in Amsterdam in 2011.

References

Further reading

External links
 Doctor June Hill Robertson McCarroll biography

1867 births
1954 deaths
American nurses
American women nurses
People from Indio, California
American women physicians
20th-century American inventors
Coachella Valley
Women inventors